Bromborough Pool is a village in Wirral, Merseyside, England.  It contains 17 buildings that are recorded in the National Heritage List for England as designated listed buildings, all of which are listed at Grade II.  This grade is the lowest of the three gradings given to listed buildings and is applied to "buildings of national importance and special interest".  Bromborough Pool is an early model village, built for the workers at the factory of Price's Patent Candle Company.  All the listed buildings were constructed for the company; most of them are workers' houses, the others being an office building, the village hall, and the church.

References

Citations

Sources

Listed buildings in Merseyside
Lists of listed buildings in Merseyside